The women's triple jump at the 2002 European Athletics Championships were held at the Olympic Stadium on August 8–10.

Medalists

Results

Qualification
Qualification: Qualification Performance 14.10 (Q) or at least 12 best performers advance to the final.

Final

External links
Results

Triple
Triple jump at the European Athletics Championships
2002 in women's athletics